Hakan Çıtak (born 2 March 1999) is a Turkish professional footballer who plays as a midfielder for the amateur club Develi Spor.

Professional career
Çıtak made his professional debut with Kayserispor in a 3–0 Süper Lig loss to Galatasaray on 10 November 2018.

References

External links
 
 
 

1999 births
Footballers from Istanbul
Living people
Turkish footballers
Association football midfielders
Kayserispor footballers
Süper Lig players